Jaime "El Flaco" Agudelo (November 10, 1925 – December 21, 2009) was a Colombian comedian and actor.

Biography
Born in Palmira, Jaime Agudelo Vidal studied systems engineering at first. He was able to develop his career as a comedian while working as a lathe operator in his home town.

In 1961 he traveled to Bogotá where he met Fernando González Pacheco, who helped him to make a name for himself while performing on the TV show, Operación Ja ja. Agudelo later worked for Campeones de la Risa in 1966 for two years.

He was one of the earliest cast members for Colombia's most famous comedy show in local TV history: Sábados Felices, which is still running after 39 years. Agudelo worked there ever since until his death. His most remembered performance was portraying a child called "Jaimito". 
 The comedian never sought to retire from the program, not even asking for leave because of health issues (with the exceptions being the instances  of two heart attacks). 
 
Canal Caracol, the show's broadcaster, paid Agudelo a respectful tribute in October 2008. Augdelo died at Cali in 2009.

Awards
Premio Antena as "Best comedian". (1975)

Filmography

Death
On December 19, 2009, Agudelo fell on his way to his home in Palmira, sustaining major hip injuries which caused a femur fracture. He was admitted to Rafael Uribe Uribe Hospital in Cali, where he died two days later, on Monday, December 21, due to respiratory failure, aged 83.

References

External links 
 Personajes de Palmira: Jaime El Flaco Agudelo
 Revista Soho (Colombia): Cuánto gana...El Flaco Agudelo
 Caracol TV, Sábados Felices
 Colarte, Biografía de Jaime Agudelo
 "Jaime 'El Flaco' Agudelo Vidal recibe el último adiós en Bogotá"

1925 births
2009 deaths
Colombian male comedians
Colombian male television actors
Deaths from respiratory failure
People from Palmira, Valle del Cauca
20th-century comedians
20th-century Colombian people